Thermacut, Inc is an international corporation which designs, manufactures, and sells replacement torches, guns, consumables, and accessories for the metal cutting and welding industries. The company’s headquarters are located in Uherske Hradiste, Czech Republic. The company operates sales warehouses in the United States, Germany, and the Czech Republic along with sales offices located in Slovakia, Poland, Hungary, Croatia, Romania, Mexico Great Britain, Russia, China, France, and Brazil.

Founding and History of Thermacut

Thermacut was founded in 1990 by Jiri Zaplatel and four other owner-employees. Mr. Zaplatel had previously worked as an engineer for competitor company Thermal Dynamics and was originally from the Czech Republic. The company’s first facility was an apartment located above the garage of Jiri's Cornish, New Hampshire home. From this makeshift facility, replacement plasma cutting torches and consumables were designed, sold, packaged, and shipped. Initially, parts were manufactured in nearby Windsor, Vermont before being returned to Cornish for packaging and shipping. All products were sold under the “Zap Plasmatherm” label, and the company focused specifically on sales to end-user customers.

In 1992 the product brand “Thermacut” was established, under which all products are distributed today. Products sold under the Thermacut name were specifically targeted for larger distributor companies, while products sold under the Zap Plasmatherm brand continued to be aimed towards end-users. Also in 1992, the first production facility, Thermacut, s.r.o., was founded with the headquarters located in Uherské Hradiště, of the Czech Republic and sales were established into Eastern and Western Europe. Profits earned by the Cornish, NH operations were used to finance the creation of a factory, and production of product was eventually phased out of Windsor and into the Czech Republic. At this time, the factory was managed by Jiri’s brother Ludek.

In 1999, the IGB Group of Cologne, Germany, purchased the majority share, 80%, of the company and finalized the ownership of 100% in 2002. This alignment with the IBG Group, allowed Thermacut to increase its global market footprint and expand its production facilities.

Present day

At the present time Thermacut operates one production company located in the Czech Republic, three sales warehouses located in Germany, the United States of America and the Czech Republic; and eleven other sales offices located in Slovakia, Poland, Hungary, Croatia, Romania, Mexico Great Britain, Russia, China, France, and Brazil.

The centralized corporate offices include the engineering team, product management, the marketing group, and production facility located at Uherské Hradiště in the Czech Republic. The facility covers an area of approximately 5 acres (2ha) and includes production and assembly halls, warehouse stock and office buildings for more than 200 Thermacut employees. The international sales department is located at Kunin in the Czech Republic and serves not only domestic accounts but also customers in more than 40 countries worldwide.

Thermacut’s specific emphasis is the manufacturing and sales of replacement and spare parts, consumables and replacement torch heads for plasma cutting/welding with additional product offerings for MIG/MAG and TIG manual welding.

Research and development program

Thermacut maintains an engineering department at the Czech production facility where it employs plasma cutting and welding specialists engaged in designing enhanced replacement parts for OEM products.

Thermacut also operates a plasma cutting laboratory. The lab is equipped with the leading OEM plasma cutting systems, which allow the cutting performance of the individual Thermacut replacement parts to be tested. Because most OEM cutting systems are protected by patents, Thermacut has the opportunity not to simply re-engineer certain products but to also develop enhanced replacement parts which circumvent patents and in many cases exceed the properties of original parts.

Based on the test results, unique solutions are developed for the individual components and consumables (material used, design, flow rates etc.) The results are high durability of the parts and improved cut quality.

Advanced consumables

Significant manufacturing attention is paid to electrodes and nozzles because these consumable parts are most frequently replaced and also influence the cutting quality and speed to a great degree. Examples of Thermacut's unique innovations are the offerings of the SilverEx- (Ag) electrodes, and the TungstenEX- (Wf) nozzles with tungsten inserts and coatings for mechanized plasma processes.

The SilverEx- electrodes and the TungstenEX- nozzles offer a number of significant advantages: higher cutting current based on the lower electrical resistance of silver, a higher number of start-ups because silver is a superior thermal conductor (vs. copper); therefore the silver electrodes operate cooler than the bi-metallic or copper electrodes while also generating an improved arc force. The TungstenEX- nozzles more than double the life of (conventional) nozzle orifices, thus again improving the process, while maintaining a focused plasma cutting arc.  This results in 15-30% higher cutting speed,(depending on thickness of material being cut) less dross, minimum kerf angle, and longer lifetime of  both the electrodes and the nozzles while extending the life torch itself due to lower generated heating effect.  Thermacut also offers a recycling program for the SilverEX- electrodes which results in an environmentally friendly product.

Machinery equipment

In keeping with the latest trends in machining Thermacut has continuously upgraded its production equipment. At present, all critical plasma consumables are manufactured by multi-spindle screw machines.

Product quality control systems

Thermacut is an ISO9001-approved production facility, that continuously invests into the latest inspection equipment as well as its personnel, who regularly monitor all production processes and packaging methods.

References

External links 
 Thermacut official website

Manufacturing companies established in 1990
Manufacturing companies of the Czech Republic
Czech brands
1990 establishments in New Hampshire
1999 mergers and acquisitions